Express 2 is a high speed catamaran operated by Molslinjen between Aarhus and Odden.  It is the sister ship of Express 1, sharing a hull design and other characteristics.

References

Ships built by Incat
Incat high-speed craft
2010 ships